Fasquelle is a French surname. Notable people with the surname include:

 Daniel Fasquelle (born 1963), French politician
 Jean-Claude Fasquelle (1930–2021), French publisher
 Solange Fasquelle (1933–2016), French writer

French-language surnames